The gens Venuleia was a patrician family of ancient Rome and of Pisa originally, which flourished from the 1st to the end of the 2nd century AD.

Known members were:
 Lucius Venuleius Montanus was proconsul of Bithynia et Pontus in during the reign of Nero, and described by Juvenal in his fourth satire
 Lucius Venuleius Pataecius, a Roman eques who governed Thracia at some point between AD 69 and 79
 Lucius Venuleius Montanus Apronianus, son of the proconsul, consul in 92.
 Lucius Venuleius consul in 123, possibly son of the consul of 92
 Lucius Venuleius Apronianus Octavius Priscus, son of the consul of 123, consul suffectus around 145 and ordinarius in 168.

The Venuleii family owned the magnificent villa-estate at Massaciuccoli in the 1st and the 2nd century AD.

References

 
Roman gentes